Quesnel or Quesnell means "little oak" in the Picard dialect of French. It is used as a proper name and may refer to:

Places
 Le Quesnel, a commune the Somme department in France
 Quesnel, British Columbia, a city in British Columbia, Canada
 Quesnel Forks, British Columbia, a ghost town in British Columbia, Canada
 Quesnell Heights, Edmonton, a neighbourhood in Edmonton, Alberta, Canada

Geographical features
 Quesnel Lake
 Quesnel River
 Quesnel Highland

People
 Adam Quesnell, stand-up comedian
 Chantal Quesnel, Canadian actress
 Désiré Quesnel (1843–1915), French wood-engraver
 François Quesnel, 16th-century French artist
 François Jean Baptiste Quesnel (1768–1819), French general under Napoleon
 Frédéric-Auguste Quesnel, Canadian lawyer and politician 
 Joseph Quesnel, Canadian operatic composer/playwright 
 Jules-Maurice Quesnel, Canadian fur-trader and politician 
 Pasquier Quesnel (1634–1719), French Jansenist theologian
 Peter Quesnel (or Quesuel) (d. 1299?), Franciscan 
 Pierre Quesnel, 16th-century French artist, worked in Scotland
 Pooky Quesnel, born Joanna Gabrielle Quesnell, English actress
 Yannick Quesnel, French football goalkeeper

Other
 Quesnel (sternwheeler) 
 Quesnell Bridge, in Edmonton AB, Canada, over North Saskatchewan River

See also
 Quensel, a superficially similar surname, but of Swedish extraction